Andrey Rochilov is a Soviet luger who competed from the late 1980s to 1990. He won the bronze medal in the mixed team event at the 1990 FIL World Luge Championships in Calgary, Alberta, Canada.

References
Hickok sports information on World champions in luge and skeleton.

Living people
Russian male lugers
Soviet male lugers
Year of birth missing (living people)